Phillips Mountains is a range of mountains on the north side of Balchen Glacier and Block Bay in the Ford Ranges, Marie Byrd Land, West Antarctica. Discovered by the Byrd Antarctic Expedition (1928–30) and named by Byrd for Albanus Phillips, Sr., a manufacturer in Cambridge, Maryland, United States, and patron of the Byrd expeditions.

Geography and geology 
Individual mountains are aligned northeast–southwest or northwest–southeast. Mountains and nunataks are composed of either Ford granodiorite (Devonian age), or Byrd Coast granite (Cretaceous age). Nunataks are mostly found north of the mountain range.

Peaks, Nunataks, and Rocks

Peaks 

 Mount Carbone
 Mount June
 Mount Paige

Nunataks 

 Abele Nunatak
 Herrmann Nunatak
 Hutcheson Nunataks
 Reddick Nunatak

Rocks and features 

 Adams Rocks
 Favela Rocks
 Groux Rock
 Lewis Rocks
Webster Bluff

Further reading 
  Donna Whitney, Christian Teyssier, Christine S. Siddoway, Gneiss Domes in Orogeny, P 271
 Bruce Luyendyk, Stan Cisowski, Christine Smith,  Steve Richard, David Kimbrough, Paleomagnetic study of the northern Ford Ranges, western Marie Byrd Land, West Antarctica: Motion between West and East Antarctica, https://doi.org/10.1029/95TC02524
 S. M. Richard, C. H. Smith, D. L. Kimbrough, Paul G Fitzgerald, B. P. Luyendyk, M. O. McWilliams, Cooling history of the northern Ford Ranges, Marie Byrd Land, West Antarctica, Tectonics, 13(4), 837–857.
 Bruce Luyendyk, Steve Richard, Christine Smith, David Kimbrough, 1991, Geological and geophysical investigations in the northern Ford Ranges, Marie Byrd Land, West Antarctica, Antarctic Journal of the United States, Volume 26, P 37 - 40.

References 

Ford Ranges
Mountains of Antarctica